Ophiovalsa is a genus of fungi in the family Gnomoniaceae.

References

External links
Ophiovalsa at Index Fungorum

Gnomoniaceae
Sordariomycetes genera